Daniel Walker Howe (born January 10, 1937) is an American historian who specializes in the early national period of U.S. history, with a particular interest in its intellectual and religious dimensions.  He was Rhodes Professor of American History at Oxford University in England (from 1992 to 2002 then Emeritus) and Professor of History Emeritus at the University of California, Los Angeles. He won the 2008 Pulitzer Prize for History for What Hath God Wrought (2007), his most famous book.  He was president of the Society for Historians of the Early American Republic in 2001, and is a Fellow of both the American Academy of Arts and Sciences and the Royal Historical Society.

Early life and education
Howe was born in Ogden, Utah and graduated from East High School in Denver. He received his Bachelor of Arts at Harvard University in 1959, magna cum laude in American history and literature, and his Ph.D. in history at University of California, Berkeley in 1966.  Howe's connection with Oxford University began when he matriculated at Magdalen College to read modern history in 1960, receiving his M.A. in 1965.

Career
Howe has taught at Yale University (1966–73), UCLA (1973-92), where he chaired the history department, and Oxford (1992-2002).  In 2011 he spent a semester as a visiting professor at Wofford College in Spartanburg, South Carolina.

In 1989–1990 Howe was Harold Vyvyan Harmsworth Professor of American History at Oxford and a fellow of The Queen's College, Oxford.  In 1992 he became a permanent member of the Oxford history faculty and a fellow of St Catherine's College, Oxford until his retirement in 2002. Brasenose College, Oxford elected him an Honorary Member of its Senior Common Room.

Awards and honors
He received an honorary Doctor of Humanities degree from Weber State University in 2014.

Personal life
He currently resides in Sherman Oaks, California, and is married with three grown children and six grandchildren as of February 2015.

Books
 The Unitarian Conscience: Harvard Moral Philosophy, 1805-1861 (Harvard University Press, 1970)
 Victorian America (University of Pennsylvania Press, 1976)
 The Political Culture of the American Whigs (University of Chicago Press, 1979)
 Making the American Self: Jonathan Edwards to Abraham Lincoln (Harvard University Press, 1997)
 What Hath God Wrought: The Transformation of America, 1815–1848 (Oxford University Press, 2007), volume 5 of the Oxford History of the United States

References

External links
Daniel W. Howe, Professor Emeritus, UCLA
 
 

1937 births
Living people
21st-century American historians
21st-century American male writers
Historians of the United States
Intellectual historians
Pulitzer Prize for History winners
Writers from Ogden, Utah
Harvard University alumni
University of California, Berkeley alumni
University of California, Los Angeles faculty
Fellows of St Catherine's College, Oxford
Harold Vyvyan Harmsworth Professors of American History
Alumni of Magdalen College, Oxford
Statutory Professors of the University of Oxford
Historians from California
American male non-fiction writers